Feofanov is a Russian masculine surname originating from the given name Feofan, its feminine counterpart is Feofanova. It may refer to
Aleksandr Feofanov (born 1976), Russian football player
Svetlana Feofanova (born 1980), Russian pole vaulter
Yevgeny Feofanov (born 1937), Soviet boxer

Russian-language surnames